Naissaar Landscape Conservation Area ( or ) is a nature park that comprises the island of Naissaar in Harju County, Estonia.

The area of the nature park is 1893 ha.

The protected area was founded in 1992 to protect landscapes and biodiversity of Naissaar Island. In 1995, the protected area was designated to the landscape conservation area.

References

Nature reserves in Estonia
Geography of Harju County